The 1999 edition of the Women's Handball Tournament of the African Games was the 5th, organized by the African Handball Confederation and played under the auspices of the International Handball Federation, the handball sport governing body. The tournament was held in Johannesburg, South Africa, contested by 7 national teams and won by Angola.

Draw

Preliminary round

Group A

Group B

Knockout stage
5–7th classification

Championship bracket

Final ranking

Awards

References

External links
 Official website

Handball at the 1999 All-Africa Games
Women's handball in South Africa
1999 in women's handball
Handball at the African Games